Katharine, Duchess of Kent,  (born Katharine Lucy Mary Worsley; 22 February 1933) is a member of the British royal family. She is married to Prince Edward, Duke of Kent, a grandson of King George V.

The Duchess of Kent converted to Roman Catholicism in 1994; she was the first member of the royal family to convert publicly since the passing of the Act of Settlement 1701. The Duchess is strongly associated with the world of music and has performed as a member of several choirs.

In 2022 she became the oldest living member of the British royal family following the death of Queen Elizabeth II.

Early life and education
Katharine Lucy Mary Worsley was born at Hovingham Hall, Yorkshire, the fourth child and only daughter of Sir William Worsley, 4th Baronet, Lord-lieutenant of North Riding, and his wife Joyce Morgan Brunner (1895–1979). Her mother was the daughter of Sir John Brunner, 2nd Baronet, and granddaughter of Sir John Brunner, 1st Baronet, the founder of Brunner Mond, which later became ICI (Imperial Chemical Industries). She is a descendant of Oliver Cromwell. Worsley was christened at All Saints' Church, Hovingham, on 2 April 1933. Her godparents were her maternal uncle Sir Felix Brunner, 3rd Baronet, Major Sir Digby Lawson, 2nd Baronet, her paternal aunt Lady Colegate, and Margaret D'Arcy Fife of Nunnington Hall.

Worsley received no formal education until she was 10. She was educated at Queen Margaret's School, York, and at Runton Hill School in North Norfolk. At school she was introduced to music, and was taught to play the piano, organ and violin, which she still plays today. In her final year at Runton Hill, she was formally elected music secretary; in this role, she organized school recitals in Norwich. She left school with a pass in oral French and a "very good" in English literature.

The Duchess has stated her admiration for the late cellist Jacqueline du Pré in the documentary Who is Jacqueline du Pré? by Christopher Nupen. She later worked for some time in a children's home in York and worked at a nursery school in London. She failed to gain admission to the Royal Academy of Music, but followed her brothers to Oxford – where they were at the University – to study at Miss Hubler's Finishing School, 22 Merton Street, devoting much of her time to music. She was one of only eight pupils there and was instructed by three different teachers: The principal, Miss Hubler, taught French literature, painting, and history; a French woman taught cookery; and a Viennese lady taught music.

Marriage

Worsley met Prince Edward, Duke of Kent, the eldest son of Prince George, Duke of Kent, and Princess Marina of Greece and Denmark, while he was based at Catterick Camp. On 8 June 1961, the couple married at York Minster, the first royal marriage in that location in 633 years (the last one being between Edward III and Philippa of Hainault). The bride's father escorted her, and the best man was Edward's brother Prince Michael of Kent. Princess Anne was one of the bridesmaids. The Archbishop of York Michael Ramsey conducted the marriage service. Guests included actors Noël Coward and Douglas Fairbanks Jr. as well as members of the British, Greek, Danish, Norwegian, Yugoslavian, Romanian, and Spanish royal families. Her white silk gauze dress was designed by John Cavanagh, used 273 yards of fabric and had "a high neckline and long sleeves and a commanding train". The Kent Diamond and Pearl Fringe Tiara secured her veil.

The couple have three living children: 

 George, Earl of St Andrews, born 26 June 1962 at Coppins; married Sylvana Tomaselli
 Lady Helen Taylor, born 28 April 1964 at Coppins; married Timothy Taylor
 Lord Nicholas Windsor, born 25 July 1970 at King's College Hospital in London; married, 2006, Paola Doimi de Lupis de Frankopan

Katharine had an abortion in 1975 owing to rubella and gave birth to a stillborn son, Patrick, in 1977; this loss sent her into a severe depression about which she has spoken publicly. "It had the most devastating effect on me," she told The Daily Telegraph in 1997. "I had no idea how devastating such a thing could be to any woman. It has made me extremely understanding of others who suffer a stillbirth."

The Duchess moved to the married quarters in Hong Kong and Germany while her husband was serving in the military. The couple later took numerous royal engagements on behalf of the Queen, including the Ugandan independence celebrations and the coronation of the King of Tonga.

Catholicism
The Duchess of Kent was received into the Catholic Church in 1994. This was a personal decision, and she received the approval of the Queen. As she explained in an interview on BBC, "I do love guidelines and the Catholic Church offers you guidelines. I have always wanted that in my life. I like to know what's expected of me. I like being told: You shall go to church on Sunday and if you don't you're in for it!" Basil Hume, then Cardinal Archbishop of Westminster and thus spiritual leader of the Catholic Church in England and Wales, warned the Church against triumphalism over the Duchess's conversion.

Although the Act of Settlement 1701 means a member of the royal family marrying a Catholic relinquishes their right of succession to the British throne, the Act does not include marriage to an Anglican who subsequently becomes a Catholic. Therefore, the Duke of Kent did not lose his place in the line of succession to the British throne.

Since then, the couple's younger son, Lord Nicholas, their grandson Lord Downpatrick, and their granddaughter Lady Marina have also become Catholics. Their elder son, Earl of St Andrews, father of Lord Downpatrick, married a Catholic and thus, had been excluded from the succession until the Succession to the Crown Act revoked that exclusion in 2015. The Dukedom of Kent is not subject to the Act of Settlement, so Downpatrick is in line to become the duke of Kent.

Recent years

In 1978, the Duchess was hospitalised for several weeks owing to "nervous strain". Reports by the BBC stated that the Duchess suffered from coeliac disease and Epstein–Barr virus, whose symptoms resemble those of ME (myalgic encephalomyelitis, also known as "chronic fatigue syndrome"). She stepped down from her role as head of the ME Society in the UK, and has since energetically worked with various charities and schools.

In 1999, the Duchess was refused permission to seat the 12-year-old son of a bereaved friend in the Royal Box at the All England Lawn Tennis and Croquet Club. Alternative seating outside the box was offered. She later received what The Daily Telegraph reported in a front-page story was a "curt letter" from club chairman John Curry, reminding her that children, other than members of the royal family, were not permitted in the Royal Box. She, in turn, threatened a boycott of the Royal Box.

The Duchess of Kent decided in 2002 not to use the style "Her Royal Highness" herself and to reduce her royal duties. Since then, she has been informally known as Katharine Kent or Katharine, Duchess of Kent, although her formal style (e.g., in the Court Circular) remains HRH The Duchess of Kent. Despite her decision to stay away from public life, the Duchess continued to appear at major events including the wedding of Prince William and Catherine Middleton in 2011, the concert at Buckingham Palace and thanksgiving service at St Paul's Cathedral during the Queen's Diamond Jubilee celebrations in 2012, and the wedding of Prince Harry and Meghan Markle in 2018. However, she did not attend the celebrations for the Queen's Platinum Jubilee nor her state funeral in 2022.

In December 1989, Katharine was a guest on the BBC Radio 4 programme Desert Island Discs. In keeping with her withdrawal from full royal duties in 1996, the Duchess took a position as a music teacher in Wansbeck Primary School in Kingston upon Hull. She also gave piano lessons in a rented studio flat near her official residence at Kensington Palace. The Duchess of Kent had served as the president of the Royal Northern College of Music, and was the director of National Foundation for Youth Music from 1999 to 2007. In March 2004, Katharine was the subject of Real Story on BBC One. She talked about her career as a music teacher saying "teaching [the children] is very satisfying. It's a privilege. To me it's one of the most exciting jobs anyone can do." In 2005, the Duchess spoke in an interview on BBC Radio 3 of her liking of rap music and of the singer/songwriter Dido, whose song "Thank You" she chose as one of her favourite pieces of music. She is patron of the charity Making Music, the National Federation of Music Societies, an umbrella organisation for amateur and voluntary music groups. Katharine is among the co-founders of Future Talent, a charity that helps young children with low-income backgrounds pursue a career in music.

In 2011, close associates of Jonathan Rees, a private investigator connected to the News International phone hacking scandal, stated that he had penetrated Katharine and Edward's bank accounts.

In May 2016, she hosted a concert for young children at Buckingham Palace in her capacity as founder of Future Talent. In August 2016, the Duchess became an ambassador for Samaritans after a volunteer at the Teesside branch contacted her. She had previously been its Royal Patron from 1971 until 1999. The Duchess is also a supporter of UNICEF. In 2022, the Duchess expressed her love and penchant for gangsta rap, typified by Eminem and Ice Cube.

Titles, styles, honours and arms

Titles and styles
Since her marriage Katharine has been known as "Her Royal Highness The Duchess of Kent".

Honours

  1961: Royal Family Order of Queen Elizabeth II
  9 June 1977: Dame Grand Cross of the Royal Victorian Order (GCVO)

Freedom of the City
 1989: Freeman of the City of York

Honorary military appointments
 United Kingdom
  Honorary Major-General, Controller Commandant, Women's Royal Army Corps
  Colonel-in-Chief, of The Prince of Wales's Own Regiment of Yorkshire
  Deputy Colonel-in-Chief, of Adjutant General's Corps
  Deputy Colonel-in-Chief, of Royal Dragoon Guards
  Deputy Colonel-in-Chief, of Royal Logistic Corps
and formerly
  Honorary Colonel, Yorkshire Volunteers

Civilian offices
 Chancellor of the University of Leeds (1966–1999)

Arms

Issue

See also
 List of people diagnosed with coeliac disease

References

External links

 The Duchess of Kent at the Royal Family website
 Future Talent Charity Website

1933 births
Living people
British Army major generals
Duchesses of Kent
Converts to Roman Catholicism from Anglicanism
Dames Grand Cross of the Royal Victorian Order
Daughters of baronets
English Roman Catholics
Honorary Members of the Royal Philharmonic Society
House of Windsor
People from Hovingham
Wives of British princes
Women's Royal Army Corps officers
Worsley family
Wives of knights
Women who experienced pregnancy loss
People associated with the University of Leeds